Jacob or Jakob Nielsen may refer to:

 Jacob Nielsen, Count of Halland (died c. 1309), great grandson of Valdemar II of Denmark
 , Norway (1768-1822)
 Jakob Nielsen (mathematician) (1890–1959), Danish mathematician known for work on automorphisms of surfaces
 Jakob Nielsen (usability consultant) (born 1957), Danish web usability consultant
 Jakob Axel Nielsen (born 1967), Danish lawyer and politician
 Jakob Nielsen (actor) (1900-1978)
 Jacob Nielsen (cyclist) (born 1978), Danish cyclist
 Jakob Ahlmann Nielsen (born 1991), Danish footballer